Ferenc Puskás Stadium may refer to:

 Ferenc Puskás Stadium (1953), stadium in Budapest, Hungary that was demolished in 2017
 Ferenc Puskás Stadium (2019), stadium in Budapest, Hungary set to open in 2019